Miguel Chacón (14 January 1930 – 28 July 2011) was a Spanish professional racing cyclist. He rode in the 1956 Tour de France. He died in Togo on 28 July 2011. His cycling career lasted 10 years (1951-1961).

References

External links
 

1930 births
2011 deaths
Spanish male cyclists
Sportspeople from Sabadell
Cyclists from Catalonia